Ukru Ukru (Quechua ukru hole, pit, hollow, the reduplication indicates that there is a complex of something, "many holes", also spelled Ucroucro) is a mountain in the Cordillera Central in the Andes of Peru which reaches a height of approximately . It is located in the Lima Region, Yauyos Province, Tanta District. Ukru Ukru lies northwest of Paqarin Pawka and Saqsa and north of Muki at a lake named Pawqarqucha.

References 

Mountains of Peru
Mountains of Lima Region